This page features a list of awards and nominations received by Greek singer and actress Katy Garbi. Since making her professional music debut in 1987 Garbi has released 20 studio albums: Prova (1989), Gyalia Karfia (1990), Entalma Silepseos (1991), Tou Feggariou Anapnoes (1992), Os Ton Paradeiso (1993), Atofio Hrysafi (1994), Arhizo Polemo (1996), Evaisthisies (1997), Hristougenna Me Tin Katy (1998), Doro Theou (1999), To Kati (2000), Apla Ta Pragmata (2001), Emmones Idees (2003), Eho Sta Matia Ourano (2005), Pos Allazei O Kairos (2006), Kainourgia Ego (2008), Pazl (2011), Buona Vita (2013), Perierges Meres (2013), Spase Tous Deiktes (2017). Garbi has also released two live albums: 18 Hronia Live (2007) and 30 Hronia Katy Garbi (Live Katrakio 2019) (2020). Garbi had her biggest commercial success with Arhizo Polemo and Evaisthisies, two of the highest selling albums of the 1990s (decade), followed by the double To Kati, which is one of the best-selling albums of the 2000s (decade) in Greece. Her albums have been released on Sony Music Entertainment Greece (1989–2009, 2013), Universal Music Greece (2010–2013) and Panik Platinum (2016–present). She has released material on Incipit Records, Front Seat, Planetworks and 2645 Records.

Garbi began her music career as a duo with her sister, Liana Garbi as Adelfes Garbi. Breaking away from the duo, Garbi featured on compilation albums Ta Deka Dekaria Vol 1 and Vol 2, which were followed by her debut solo album Prova. In 1992, Garbi's fourth album Tou Feggariou Anapnoes was certified gold and spawned Garbi's first commercial hit "Pes To M'Ena Fili". This led to her participating in the Eurovision Song Contest 1993 with "Ellada, Hora Tou Fotos", taking 9th place. The same year Garbi began collaborating with songwriter Phoebus in a partnership that resulted in 1 gold, 1 platinum and 3 multi-platinum albums.

Garbi's popularity culminated in the mid-1990s early-2000s (decade), becoming a prominent performer of the laiko-pop genre reigning at the time. The first annual music awards were materialized in Greece with the launch of the Pop Corn Music Awards; in 1997 Garbi won four awards for her album Arhizo Polemo. She was awarded album of the year and song of the year in 1999, for album Evaisthisies and its title track, respectively. Garbi has also received one Arion Music Award, and received two honorary MAD Video Music Award for her 30 years of discography in 2019 and for outstanding contribution to the Greek music industry in 2022 citing sales in excess of 2,000,000. She has been nominated for awards in laïko, contemporary laïko, pop, and dance categories and has won 12 recognized awards from over 45 nominations.

This list includes only recognized awards and not polls and other awards. Also, the list may be incomplete due to the lack of sources on Greek awards prior to the new 2000 millennium.

Arion Music Awards
The Arion Music Awards are the official Greek music industry awards by IFPI Greece since 2002, after the Pop Corn Music Awards, which were organized by the Greek magazine Pop Corn from 1992–2001, were discontinued. The Arion Awards were broadcast by Mega Channel in their first five years before moving to ANT1 channel. The awards have not been held since 2007 for various reasons. Katy Garbi has won one award, in a tie with Natasa Theodoridou from five nominations.

|-
| rowspan="3" align="center"|2002
|  rowspan="5" |Katy Garbi
| Female Singer of the Year
|
|-
| Best Female for Laïko
|
|-
| Best Female for Modern Laïko
|
|-
| align="center"|2004
| Best Female for Modern Laïko
|
|-
| align="center"|2006
| Best Female for Laïko
|
|-

Eurovision awards
The Eurovision Song Contest is an annual competition held among active member countries of the EBU. The contest, which has been broadcast every year since its début in 1956, is one of the longest-running television programs and most watched in the world. Garbi represented Greece in 1993, finishing in ninth place.

MAD Video Music Awards
The MAD Video Music Awards are held annually in June by MAD TV since 2004. In its first two years, the awards were televised on ANT1 for non-satellite viewers, but have since moved to Alpha TV. Garbi has performed five times at the awards (2005, 2013, 2015, 2019 and 2022), and presented an award to Anna Vissi in 2004 and Antonis Remos in 2013. Garbi has received 10 nominations, an honorary award in 2019 for her 30 years of discography, and an honorary award for her outstanding contribution to the Greek music industry 

|-
| rowspan="1" align="center"|2004
| rowspan="1" |Katy Garbi in Na Pernas
| Fashion Icon
|
|-
| rowspan="1" align="center"|2006
| rowspan="1" |Spaciba Baby
| Best Duet Video Clip
|
|-
| rowspan="1" align="center"|2007
|  rowspan="1" |Esena Mono Mokka vs Katy Garbi
| Best Dance Video Clip
|
|-
| rowspan="1" align="center"|2015
|  rowspan="5" |Katy Garbi
| Best Female Adult
|
|-
| rowspan="1" align="center"|2018
| Best Female Adult
|
|-
| rowspan="2" align="center"|2019
| Best Female Adult
|
|-
| Artist Recognition Award
|
|-
| rowspan="2" align="center"|2021
| Best Female Adult
|
|-
| rowspan="1" |Katy Garbi and Antonis Remos in Kivotos
| Song of the Year
|
|-
| rowspan="3" align="center"|2022
|  rowspan="2" |Katy Garbi
| Best Female Adult
|
|-
| Artist Recognition Award
|
|-
| rowspan="1" |Katy Garbi and Dionysis Schinas in Atofio Hrisafi
| Song of the Year
|
|-

Pop Corn Music Awards
The Greek Pop Corn Music Awards are a defunct awards ceremony that were the first official Greek music awards show from 1992-2001 and were organized by the Greek magazine Pop Corn. The Arion Music Awards became the new national music awards ceremony in 2001 after the Pop Corns were discontinued. Garbi has received 12 awards from over 33 nominations.

|-
| rowspan="1" align="center"|1993
| rowspan="1" |Tou Feggariou Anapnoes
| Best LP
|
|-
| rowspan="2" align="center"|1994
|  rowspan="1" |"Nai Yparho Ego"
| Song of the Year
|
|-
|  rowspan="1" |Katy Garbi
| Female Artist of the Year
|
|-
| rowspan="4" align="center"|1995
|  rowspan="1" |Atofio Hrysafi
| Album of the Year
|
|-
|  rowspan="1" |"Ksypoliti Horevo"
| Best Laiko Dance Track
|
|-
|  rowspan="1" |"Zisame"
| Best Duet
|
|-
|  rowspan="1" |"Mi Me Sigkrineis"
| Best Lyrics
|
|-
| rowspan="5" align="center"|1996
|  rowspan="1" |Arhizo Polemo
| Album of the Year
|
|-
|  rowspan="1" |"Perasmena Ksehasmena"
| Best Laiko Dance Song
|
|-
|  rowspan="1" |"Arhizo Polemo"
| Best Lyrics
|
|-
|  rowspan="1" |"Tha Melagholiso"
| Best Composition
|
|-
|  rowspan="2" |Katy Garbi
| Female Artist of the Year
|
|-
| rowspan="1" align="center"|1997
| Female Artist of the Year
|
|-
| rowspan="6" align="center"|1998
|  rowspan="1" |Evaisthisies
| Album of the Year
|
|-
|  rowspan="2" |"Evaisthisies"
| Song of the Year
|
|-
| Radio Sfera 102.1 Song of the Year
|
|-
|  rowspan="1" |"Apozimiosi"
| Best Female Interpretation
|
|-
|  rowspan="2" |Katy Garbi
| Best Female Stage Performance
|
|-
| Female Artist of the Year
|
|-
| rowspan="7" align="center"|1999
|  rowspan="1" |"Agkires"
| Best Laiko Dance Song
|
|-
|  rowspan="2" |Doro Theou
| Best Artwork
|
|-
| Album of the Year
|
|-
|  rowspan="1" |"Pos Fovamai Na Sou Po"
| Best Female Interpretation
|
|-
|  rowspan="1" |"Doro Theou"
| Best Lyrics
|
|-
|  rowspan="2" |Katy Garbi
| Best Female Stage Performance
|
|-
| Female Artist of the Year
|
|-
| rowspan="7" align="center"|2000
|  rowspan="1" |"Epitelous"
| Best Duet/Collaboration
|
|-
|  rowspan="1" |To Kati
| Album of the Year
|
|-
|  rowspan="2" |"To Kati"
| Song of the Year
|
|-
| Best Dance Track
|
|-
|  rowspan="1" |"To Lathos"
| Best Female Interpretation
|
|-
|  rowspan="2" |Katy Garbi
| Best Female Stage Performance
|
|-
| Female Artist of the Year
|
|-

Super Music Awards
The Super Music Awards are the current music awards of Cyprus, held annually in June by Super FM Radio (Cyprus) since 2016. Garbi has received seven nominations, four in recognition of the album Spase Tous Deiktes.

Other honours
 On 14 March 2010, Alpha TV ranked Garbi the eighth top-certified Greek female artist by IFPI Greece during the phonographic era (since 1960).
 On 9 May 1997, Garbi became the first Greek female artist to perform at Radio City Music Hall in New York City.

References

Garbi, Katy
Awards